Carlos "Apdaly" Lopez (born December 2, 1994) is an off-road racing driver from Tecate, Baja California. Lopez won the gold medal in the Stadium Super Trucks class at the X Games Austin 2014. His father, Juan Carlos Lopez, is also a professional off-road racer.

Career history
Lopez made his debut in the SCORE International championship at the 2011 Baja 250. He won the ATVPRO 25 class with co-drivers Ivan Mejorado and Gilberto Perez in a Honda TRX450.

Lopez competed in the newly-formed Stadium Super Trucks Super Buggy championship in 2013. At the Qualcomm Stadium Lopez won two races. He also competed in the main series at St. Louis and Costa Mesa. At St. Louis the Mexican driver finished fourth. In Costa Mesa Lopez finished third in two out three races.

In 2014 Lopez participated in the San Felipe 250. As a co-driver to Clyde Stacy the duo competed in the SCORE Trophy Truck class. The duo finished sixth in class, eighth overall. He also competed full-time in the Stadium Super Trucks. After a solid start of the season Lopez won the second race at Indianapolis Motor Speedway in support of the 2014 Grand Prix of Indianapolis. He had another good run during the X Games Austin 2014 where the Stadium Super Trucks made their debut. At the modified Circuit of the Americas Lopez won his heat race and subsequently won the final to claim his first X Games gold medal. Lopez went on to claim nine top three finishes during the season to claim third place in the championship.

After failing to qualify for the X Games Austin 2015 final (he finished last in his heat and 13th in the Last Chance Qualifier), Lopez did not return to SST until 2016 when he participated in the Mike's Peak Hill Climb Challenge. His next series points race took place in 2017 with the Race & Rock World Championship at Lake Elsinore Diamond; Lopez won the first race but retired from the second after flipping. He also ran the 2018 season opener at the baseball park, a race in which he shared the victory with Bill Hynes due to confusion as multiple drivers had failed to take the Joker Lap.

Personal
Lopez studied engineering at cetys universidad  in Tijuana, Baja California.

Motorsports career results

Stadium Super Trucks
(key) (Bold – Pole position. Italics – Fastest qualifier. * – Most laps led.)

References

Off-road racing drivers
People from Tecate
Racing drivers from Baja California
Stadium Super Trucks drivers
X Games athletes
Living people
1994 births